Rebar Ahmed Khalid Barzani (born 1 July 1968) is an Iraqi Kurdish politician, interior minister of Iraqi Kurdistan, and a candidate for president of Iraq in 2022 after 2021 Iraqi parliamentary election. and on 13 October 2022, he withdrew his candidacy for the position.

Career 
 Major General and Head of the Joint Coordination Department of Kurdistan Region Security Council, 2012.
 Director of Intelligence Analysis of the Kurdistan Region's Parasteen Agency, 2005–2012.
 Director of Counter-Organized Crimes for the Defense Department of the Kurdistan Region's Agency, 2000–2005.
 Director of Organize (Rekhesten) Office, 1997–2000.
 Member of the Administration Committee of Kurdistan Students’ Union, 1993–1997.
 Member of the KDP's Office, Since 1997.
 Member of the Shanadar Organization for the Reconstruction of Kurdistan, 2000.
 Member of the Kurdistan Engineering Union.

References

1968 births
Kurdish politicians
Living people
Kurdistan Democratic Party politicians
Iraqi Kurdish people